AHM Shamsuddin Chowdhury Manik is a retired judge of the Appellate Division of Bangladesh Supreme Court who gained notoriety for a number of controversial cases. He was also criticized for submitting verdicts in cases after retirement. Because of his involvement in many controversies, He didn't get farewell in his last working day from Attorney general office as well as Supreme Court bar association.

Career
Manik started his legal career in 1978 as a lawyer in the Bangladesh High Court. He was appointed the deputy attorney general of Bangladesh in 1996. On 3 July 2001, he was appointed by the Bangladesh Awami League government to the Bangladesh High Court as an additional judge. The Bangladesh Nationalist Party, which came to power in 2001, did not confirm his appointment. In 2003, he accused traffic police officers of contempt of court for not saluting his car. The Inspector General of Police of Bangladesh Police, Shahudul Haque, issued a rejoinder that said traffic police are under no obligations to salute anyone and they could do so if it was safe. Bangladesh High Court bench of Justice M A Matin and Justice Syed Refat Ahmed issued a contempt of court charge against Haque which automatically removed him from the post of Inspector General according to the law. The government of Bangladesh secured a presidential pardon that protected Haque's job.

On 2 March 2009, Manik was reinstated to the court, along with 11 other additional judges, following a High Court verdict in their favor. On 25 March 2009, he was appointed as a full judge to the Bangladesh High Court by the Awami League government, which came to power in 2009. In 2012, Bangladesh Parliament passed a unanimous resolution condemning Manik and accusing him of violating the constitution. Awami League leader, Tofail Ahmed, called him a sadist. He was accused of forcing traffic Sergeants to do sit up while holding their ears in court for not saluting the car of a high court judge. He also accused Manik of forcefully sitting in business class seats when he bought economy class tickets through the misuse of his position. On 31 March 2013, he was promoted to the Appellate Division of the Supreme Court. He superseded 21 judges who were his senior. The editor of the Amar Desh, Mahmudur Rahman, called for his removal.

Manik retired on 1 October 2015. He was removed from the bench on orders from Surendra Kumar Sinha, Chief Justice of Bangladesh. He had secretly recorded a conversation between him and Sinha, and published the conversation in The Daily Janakantha. Supreme Court Bar Association in a vote decided against hosting a farewell for Manik, and the Attorney General Office also decided against a farewell ceremony. It was a departure from the tradition of holding farewell ceremony for retiring senior judges. The Bar accused Manik of not signing judgements or writing them, and sending 14 lawyers to jail.  He sought the impeachment of Chief Justice Sinha from President Abdul Hamid after the Chief Justice removed him from the bench.

Manik submitted 65 orders and judgements after his retirement on 10 February 2016. According to him, he still had 20 judgements and orders pending. Justice Imman Ali was ordered to examine the judgements and Justice Md. Abdul Wahhab Miah was ordered to scrutinize them. Manik also faced criticism for holding a press conference on the Bangladesh Supreme Court premises on 1 October 2015, against rules of the court, where he asked the Chief Justice to accept pending judgements from him after retirement. The chief justice asked him to send all the judgements and documents to the Supreme Court's registrar general's office and not hold press conferences.

On 22 February 2016, SM Zulfiqur Ali, lawyer of the Supreme Court, filed a petition with Bangladesh High Court seeking a media gag order on statements by Manik. He accused Manik of undermining the judiciary of Bangladesh. The petition was rejected by the Bangladesh High Court.

Post retirement
On 28 April 2016, the Bangladesh Supreme Court decided to rehear 161 cases in which judgements were provided by Manik after his retirement. This was done following a judgement by Chief Justice Surendra Kumar Sinha, that declared verdicts given after retirement were unconstitutional. He bitterly criticised Sinha after a dispute developed between the Government of Bangladesh and Sinha. The Supreme Court ultimately decided to rehear only few of the 161 cases as necessary.

Manik was physically assaulted on Bethnal Green, London, United Kingdom in October 2015. According to his daughter, Nadia Choudhury, the attackers were members of Bangladesh Nationalist Party. On 16 March 2017, a defamation case was filed against him following his criticism of Justice Sinha in the media. The case was dismissed by the court on 4 December 2017 He is a dual citizen of the United Kingdom and Bangladesh. He taught constitutional law at the University of London.

In October 2021, Sarkar appointed a four-member team to manage Evaly, an e-commerce site which was going through financial crises, led by retired judge AHM Shamsuddin Chowdhury Manik.

Justice Muhammad Khurshid Alam Sarkar appointed retired justice AHM Shamsuddin Chowdhury Manik on 3 February 2022 liquidator of Jubilee Bank.

Landmark judgments 
 Shah Abdul Hannan v Bangladesh
 Govt of Bangladesh v Abdul Quader Molla

References

Living people
20th-century Bangladeshi lawyers
Academics of the University of London
Bangladeshi emigrants to England
21st-century Bangladeshi judges
Year of birth missing (living people)